Spurveskjul is Nicolai Abildgaard's former country house in Virum north of Copenhagen, Denmark.

History
Nicolai Abildgaard bought a property in Virum and in 1804-05 constructed a new two-storey country house for his own use. He gave it the name Spurveskjul (Sparrow's Hideaway) after the adjacent forest. The house was surrounded by an extensive garden. Abildgaard wrote many of his friends in Italy and France, asking them to bring plants and seeds for his garden back to Denmark. He was one of the first to grow broccoli in Denmark. Abildgaard died at Spurveskjul on 4 June 1809.

Architecture
The two-storey main building from 1805 stands on an older foundation. It is a narrow, rectangular building constructed with timber framing and white finishing. The thatched roof features a wall dormer on both sides. The triangular gable of the south-facing dormer features a portrait relief of Nicolai Abildgaard. The main entrance is located in the western gable.

A one-storey side wing extends from the east gable of the two-storey main wing. It was originally a free-standing building from the 17030s but connected to the main wing in 1846. It now contains a kitchen, bathroom and a room with an open fireplace.

Today
The architect Jørgen Rasmussen bought the house for DKK 2.2 mio. in 1992.

References

External links

Houses in Lyngby-Taarbæk Municipality
Listed buildings and structures in Lyngby-Taarbæk Municipality
Neoclassical architecture in Copenhagen
Houses completed in 1805
1805 establishments in Denmark